Bupranolol is a non-selective beta blocker without intrinsic sympathomimetic activity (ISA), but with strong membrane stabilizing activity. Its potency is similar to propranolol.

Uses and dosage
Like other beta blockers, oral bupranolol can be used to treat hypertension and tachycardia. The initial dose is 50 mg two times a day. It can be increased to 100 mg four times a day. Bupranolol eye drops (0.05%-0.5%) are used against glaucoma.

Pharmacology 
Bupranolol is quickly and completely absorbed from the gut. Over 90% undergo first-pass metabolism. Bupranolol has a plasma half life of about two to four hours, with levels never reaching 1 µg/L in therapeutic doses. The main metabolite is carboxybupranolol, 4-chloro-3-[3-(1,1-dimethylethylamino)-2-hydroxy-propyloxy]benzoic acid – that is, the methyl group at the benzene ring is oxidized to a carboxyl group –, of which 88% are eliminated renally within 24 hours.

Adverse effects, contraindications, interactions 
Adverse effects, contraindications and interactions are similar to other beta blockers.

References

Further reading 

 

Antiarrhythmic agents
Beta blockers
Chloroarenes
N-tert-butyl-phenoxypropanolamines